The women's 100 metre backstroke event at the 1952 Olympic Games took place on 29–31 July at the Swimming Stadium. This swimming event used the backstroke. Because an Olympic-size swimming pool is 50 metres long, this race consisted of two lengths of the pool.

Medalists

Results

Heats
Eight fastest swimmer advanced to the finals.

Heat 1

Heat 2

Heat 3

Final

Key: DSQ = Disqualified

References

External links
Women 100m Backstroke Swimming Olympic Games 1952 Helsinki (FIN), retrieved 2013-12-30

Women's backstroke 100 metre
1952 in women's swimming
Women's events at the 1952 Summer Olympics